Valery Tregubov (19 March 1942 – 1986) was a Russian boxer. He competed in the men's light middleweight event at the 1972 Summer Olympics.

References

1942 births
1986 deaths
Russian male boxers
Olympic boxers of the Soviet Union
Boxers at the 1972 Summer Olympics
Sportspeople from Volgograd
Light-middleweight boxers